Balık çorbası() is the Turkish word for a fish soup or çorba, traditional to Ottoman cuisine. It is included in an 1859 cookbook, the first printed Ottoman cookbook.

Varieties in Ottoman Cuisine 
In the first Ottoman printed cookbook, Melceü't-Tabbâhîn, there is a recipe as balık çorbası.

See also
 List of fish dishes
 List of soups

References

Turkish soups
Fish and seafood soups
Ottoman cuisine